The Third Miracle is a 1999 drama film directed by Agnieszka Holland and starring Ed Harris and Anne Heche. The film was shot in Hamilton, Ontario, Canada.

Plot
In Bystrica, Slovakia in 1944, near the end of World War II, an Allied bombing raid causes a tiny girl to pray for deliverance.

In Chicago, in 1979, Father Frank Shore (Ed Harris) is a priest, now a Postulator, who investigates claims of miracles for the Vatican performed by a devout woman whose death caused a statue of the Virgin Mary to bleed upon and cure a girl with terminal lupus. Now the woman has been nominated for sainthood.

Having never encountered a genuine miracle, he is known as the "Miracle Killer" for his track record for debunking false claims of miracles.  Father Frank is suffering a crisis of faith when he is sent to investigate the miracles of a woman, the late Helen O'Regan who has been nominated for sainthood, and winds up becoming the greatest advocate for her canonization.

Father Frank uncovers a series of extraordinary events but the most extraordinary thing of all may be the "saint's" very earthly daughter, Roxane (Anne Heche). Roxane is a non-believer who cannot forgive her otherwise selfless mother for abandoning her at the age of 16.

Cast
 Ed Harris as Father Frank Shore
 Anne Heche as Roxanne
 Armin Mueller-Stahl as Werner
 Michael Rispoli as John Leone
 Charles Haid as Bishop Cahill
 Barbara Sukowa as Helen

Soundtrack
The soundtrack to The Third Miracle was released on December 14, 1999.

References

External links
 
 

1999 films
1999 drama films
American Zoetrope films
Films about Catholicism
Sony Pictures Classics films
Films shot in Hamilton, Ontario
Films directed by Agnieszka Holland
Films scored by Jan A. P. Kaczmarek
American drama films
Franchise Pictures films
Films produced by Elie Samaha
Films produced by Steven Haft
2000s English-language films
1990s English-language films
1990s American films